Hibbertia tomentosa is a species of flowering plant in the family Dilleniaceae and is endemic to the Northern Territory. It is a small, spreading to low-lying shrub with its foliage covered with rosette-like hairs, and has linear leaves and yellow flowers arranged singly on the ends of short side branches, with fourteen to twenty stamens arranged in bundles around two densely scaly carpels.

Description
There are fourteen to twenty stamens arranged in bundles around two densely scaly carpels, each carpel with two ovules. Flowering occurs from January to June.

Taxonomy
Hibbertia tomentosa was first formally described in 1817 by Augustin Pyramus de Candolle from an unpublished description by Robert Brown. De Candolle's description was published in his Regni Vegetabilis Systema Naturale. The specific epithet (tomentosa) means "tomentose".

Distribution
This hibbertia often grows on sandstone escarpments and is found on the Arnhem Land Plateau in the Northern Territory.

Conservation status
Hibbertia tomentosa is classified as "least concern" under the Northern Territory Government Northern Territory Government Territory Parks and Wildlife Conservation Act 1976.

See also
List of Hibbertia species

References

tomentosa
Flora of the Northern Territory
Plants described in 1817
Taxa named by Augustin Pyramus de Candolle